Tideford Cross is a hamlet in Cornwall, England, United Kingdom. It is about one mile north of Tideford.

References

Hamlets in Cornwall